The men's 3000 metres relay event at the 2017 Summer Universiade was held on 23 August at the Yingfeng Riverside Park Roller Sports Rink (A).

Results

Preliminary Round

Finals

References 

Roller sports at the 2017 Summer Universiade